Thomas Patrick Colicchio (born August 15, 1962) is an American celebrity chef. He co-founded the Gramercy Tavern in New York City, and formerly served as a co-owner and as the executive chef. He is also the founder of Crafted Hospitality, which includes Craft (NYC and Los Angeles), Temple Court (NYC), Craftsteak (MGM Grand Las Vegas), Heritage Steak (Mirage Las Vegas) and Small Batch (Long Island) restaurants. Colicchio is the recipient of five James Beard Foundation Awards for cooking accomplishments.

He has been the head judge on every season of Bravo reality TV show Top Chef as well as Best New Restaurant which he also executive produces. Colicchio has also been a featured chef on Great Chefs shows.

Early life
Colicchio was born in Elizabeth, New Jersey, the middle son of Beverly Ann (née Corvelli) and Thomas Patrick Colicchio. He has an older brother Michael and a younger brother Philip John. His father was a union organizer. He is of Italian descent on both sides. He graduated in 1980 from Elizabeth High School.<ref>[https://www.bloomberg.com/features/2016-how-did-i-get-here/tom-colicchio.html How Did I Get Here? Tom Colicchio; Owner, Crafted Hospitality; head judge, Top Chef"], Bloomberg Businessweek. Accessed November 2, 2019. "Elizabeth High School, Elizabeth, N.J., class of 1980"</ref>

Career
In the mid-1980s, Colicchio served as a sous-chef to Thomas Keller at Rakel.

In July 1994, Colicchio and his partner Danny Meyer opened the Gramercy Tavern in the Gramercy Park neighborhood of Manhattan. It was voted Most Popular Restaurant in New York City by the Zagat Survey in 2003 and 2005. He sold his interest in 2006 and is no longer affiliated with the restaurant. In spring 2001, he opened the first Craft restaurant one block south of Gramercy Tavern. A year later, he opened the first Craftsteak at the MGM Grand in Las Vegas. In 2003, he began the first , his sandwich shop. In 2010, he opened Colicchio & Sons, and also Riverpark. Shortly after the September 11 attacks, Colicchio volunteered serving food to rescue workers at Ground Zero.

Colicchio won the 2010 Outstanding Chef award from the James Beard Foundation.

Colicchio has written three cookbooks. He, Jeff Bridges, and Raj Patel appeared in the documentary film A Place at the Table released in the U.S. on March 1, 2013. The movie was directed by his wife Lori Silverbush. He is also Executive Producer of A Place At The Table.

Colicchio serves on the Food Council at City Harvest and the Culinary Council at Food Bank for New York City, two hunger-relief organizations. Colicchio has long been involved in food supply chain, restaurant and hunger relief issues.

Television
Colicchio has been involved with Top Chef since its beginning in 2006, where he has served as head judge. 
He is also the main consulting producer on Bravo's Top Chef spin-off series entitled Top Chef Masters. He also won an Emmy Award in 2010 for Outstanding Reality-Competition Programming as an executive producer of Top Chef, on which he appears.

Colicchio was the host of the reality series Best New Restaurant (an adaptation of the British reality show Ramsay's Best Restaurant) in 2015.

Colicchio appeared in the fifth episode of the first season of HBO's Treme as himself along with fellow chefs Eric Ripert, David Chang and Wylie Dufresne. He made another cameo in Season 2 alongside Ripert. In 2011, he made cameos in the Season 23 premiere episode of The Simpsons, "The Falcon and the D'ohman," and The Smurfs''.
Colicchio appeared in The tenth episode of fifth season of Billions (TV Series) as a chef.

Podcasting
In June 2020, Colicchio launched his podcast, "Citizen Chef" via the iHeartRadio Podcast Network. The seasonal series deals with issues of food, politics, policy and citizenship.

Restaurants
Craft
New York City
Los Angeles

Craftsteak
Las Vegas

Small Batch
Garden City, NY

Temple Court (formerly known as Fowler & Wells)
 New York City

Tom Colicchio's Heritage Steak
Las Vegas, The Mirage

New York City

Former restaurants
 Beachcraft, Miami Beach, closed
 Craft, Dallas, closed June 30, 2012
 Craft and Craftbar, Atlanta, closed
 Craftbar, New York City, closed
Craftsteak, MGM Grand at Foxwoods, closed
Colicchio & Sons, New York City, closed
Gramercy Tavern, New York City, no longer affiliated
Riverpark, New York City, no longer affiliated
 Topping Rose House, Bridgehampton, NY, no longer affiliated
, Las Vegas, closed
, San Francisco, closed

Personal life
He has been married to filmmaker Lori Silverbush since 2001.
He has three sons: Dante (born 1993), his child with an ex-girlfriend, and his two children with Silverbush, Luka Bodhi (born 2009) and Mateo Lev (born 2011).

Books

References

External links

 
 

1962 births
American chefs
American male chefs
American people of Italian descent
American restaurateurs
Living people
Participants in American reality television series
Primetime Emmy Award winners
Businesspeople from Elizabeth, New Jersey
Businesspeople from New York City
Elizabeth High School (New Jersey) alumni
James Beard Foundation Award winners